Pierluigi Praturlon (1924–1999) was an Italian set photographer, particularly known for his work with film director Federico Fellini.

Praturlon was born in Rome.

He was the official set photographer on more than 400 films, including Ben Hur, Cleopatra, La grande guerra, Thunderball, Grand Prix, La Dolce Vita, The Pink Panther, Matrimonio all’italiana, Amarcord, and La Ciociara.

Praturlon was Sophia Loren's personal photographer, and Frank Sinatra consulted with him on which tapestries to hang in his private jet.

He died in Rome in 1999.

References 

1924 births
1999 deaths
Italian photographers